The Man with the Golden Touch (orig. , lit. "The Golden Man") is an 1872 novel by Hungarian novelist Mór Jókai. As Jókai states in the afterword of the novel, The Man with the Golden Touch was based on a true story he had heard from his grand-aunt as a child.

Plot summary

Part I – The St. Barbara
Mihály Timár is a young man working on the transport ship St. Barbara on the River Danube. The ship is owned by Athanáz Brazovics, a rich Serbian merchant living in Komárom, a town in Hungary, and is on its way back to Komárom carrying sacks of wheat. The owner of the goods, Euthym Trikalisz, and his thirteen-year-old daughter Timéa are also aboard. On the way to Komárom, they stop at an island, the "no man's island," which lies in the Danube between the Ottoman Empire and the Hungarian part of the Habsburg Empire, undiscovered and unclaimed by both. This island is the home of Teréza, a widow, and her young daughter Noémi, who lead a calm and idyllic life here. Another man, Tódor Krisztyán, arrives soon. He knows Teréza and Noémi, but is apparently disliked by both.

The travellers spend a night here, but Timár cannot sleep and overhears a conversation in which Krisztyán blackmails Teréza by threatening to reveal the island’s existence to the authorities. When Teréza says they have no money, Krisztyán takes away the golden bracelet Timéa gave to Noémi, then leaves the island. Timár tells Teréza that he overheard the conversation; in turn, Teréza tells him that her husband was ruined and driven to suicide by Krisztyán's father and, Athanáz Brazovics and so she fled to the island with her baby daughter. The latter was raised there, unspoiled by civilization. She also tells him that Krisztyán always demands money from her and wants to marry Noémi even though the girl hates him. Timár feels frustrated that he cannot help Teréza.

The next day the ship continues its journey. Mr. Trikalisz wants to speak to Timár in private. He reveals that he is in fact not a Greek merchant but Ali Csorbadzsi, a former high-ranking official of the Ottoman Empire, who is fleeing the Empire because the Sultan wants him dead, his wealth was confiscated, and his daughter was added to the harem. He wanted to go to Brazovics, who is his brother-in-law, but the previous day he recognized Krisztyán as a spy of the Ottoman Empire (Krisztyán is, in fact, a scoundrel, adventurer and a spy of both empires). He knows Krisztyán will betray him and Austria will extradite him to the Ottoman Empire, so he has taken poison, and makes Timár swear that he will make sure Timéa arrives in Komárom safe. He gives a small box with 1000 gold coins to Timár and makes him promise he will keep it for Timéa; he also mentions that the rest of his wealth is the wheat in the sacks (which is worth ten thousand gold coins). Finally, he asks Timár to wake up Timéa when he has died – he gave her a potion so that she will sleep and they could speak in private, but if she was not given the antidote soon, the potion would kill her.

Csorbadzsi then dies. Timár is tempted by the amount of money – if he let Timéa die and reported that Csorbadzsi traveled on the ship, one third of the confiscated wealth would be his by law. Because of his honesty and his awakening love for Timéa, he shrinks back from the evil thoughts. He wakes Timéa, gives her the antidote and tells her about her father's death. Later, when they arrive at the next city and the police catch up with their ship, he tells them he knows nothing about the escaped Turkish pasha and his treasure and that they only carried a Greek merchant on the ship, but he died. Thus he saved Timéa's wealth for her. Later he begins to wonder that if Csorbadzsi's remaining wealth was ten thousand gold coins, that could have been carried in a bag, why did he buy wheat with it, which fills a whole ship? And if this is the whole wealth, why does the Sultan pursue them?

As they continue their journey, the ship runs on a cliff and sinks, with Timéa and Timár barely escaping.

Part II – Timéa
Timár takes Timéa to the Brazovics mansion in Komárom. Brazovics himself is not at home, so they are greeted by his wife Zsófia, their daughter Athalie and Athalie's suitor Lieutenant Imre Kacsuka, who was Timár's friend since childhood. Brazovics arrives home just when Timéa is introduced to her new family. He has just read in the newspapers that Csorbadzsi fled the Ottoman Empire with his daughter, so he hurried home to meet them. He warmly welcomes Timéa, but when he receives the small box full of gold and learns that the ship went under with the rest of the pasha's possessions, he becomes angry and accuses Timár of stealing the rest of the money. Timár coldly refuses the accusation, and asks what should be done with the sunken ship. Brazovics charges him to auction off the wheat, which is worth almost nothing, lying soaked in the sunken ship. Timár leaves. Brazovics and his wife agree that Timéa's inheritance is not enough to raise her as a noble lady, but since she is their niece, they have to look after her, so she will be a companion to Athalie – not exactly a servant, but neither their adopted daughter.

Timár meets Kacsuka, who is in charge of supplying the army with bread. Kacsuka advises Timár to buy the shipload of worthless wheat and sell it cheap to the army. He assures him that the army will buy from him, not from others, since he can sell the cheapest wheat, and he will gain a great profit. Timár is hesitating, for he knows what poor quality the bread made of that wheat will be, but when Kacsuka tells him that this way he could make some money to compensate Timéa for the loss of her inheritance, he agrees. He buys the shipload and inspects the workers bringing it out from the river. He notices a red crescent painted on one of the sacks and recalls Csorbadzsi's last words, when he said something about the red crescent but couldn't finish the sentence before he died. Timár takes away that sack when nobody notices, and opening it he finds it to be full of treasure.

He struggles with his conscience. He feels that it rightfully belongs to Timéa, but he also knows that if he gave it to her now, all of it would be taken by Brazovics. Finally, he decides he will keep the money, invest it, increase his wealth and later he will ask Timéa to marry him, sharing his wealth with her. Still, a voice deep in his mind says "you are a thief".

Timár becomes rich, buys a house in the town and is invited to the social events of the elite. Only Brazovics suspects that there's something amiss. One night Timár, to fend off all danger, pretends to be drunk and tells Brazovics about making bread from the drenched wheat and selling it to the army. Brazovics swears he will keep that information secret, but of course he immediately reports Timár to the Ministry of Finance, which was in charge of funding the supply of the army. There is, however, no one to bear witness against Timár; all the soldiers say they never ate better bread than what Timár sold them. Timár is thus acquitted of all charges, and everyone expects him to demand compensation from the minister who ordered the investigation. But Timár is still looking for a way to explain to the world how he became rich, in order to be able to use the rest of his wealth too. He travels to Vienna, asks for an audience with the minister, and asks him to lease out a land on the countryside, in Levetinc to him. The minister, pleased that Timár is not demanding an apology for the false accusations, and knowing that the previous tenant of that land went into debt, agrees. He also makes Timár a nobleman, with the title "of Levetinc" added to his name.

Timár, as the new landlord of Levetinc, is supervising the agricultural work on the fields. He gains more and more money and becomes the richest wheat merchant in Komárom. He gives a lot to charity, founds a hospital, gives money to schools, churches, and beggars. He is like King Midas, everything he touches becomes gold, each of his investments is successful, and the people in the town nickname him “the man with the golden touch”. However, he still feels deep in his heart that all this wealth does not belong to him.

Meanwhile, Athalie Brazovics is preparing for her wedding with Kacsuka. Her father, Athanáz Brazovics hates and envies Timár for his success, but always greets him with a warm welcome in his house, thinking that he is courting Athalie, and not knowing that he visits them because of Timéa.

Athalie is playing a cruel game – she knows that Timéa is in love with Kacsuka, and told her that Kacsuka will marry her. Timéa is sewing and embroidering her bridal gown, not knowing that it is Athalie's, not her own, and it will be Athalie marrying Kacsuka, not her. She even converts to Christianity for the marriage's sake. Timár knows about this cruel game and dislikes Athalie and her family more and more.

Brazovics asks Timár if he is planning to ask for Athalie's hand. Timár refuses this, and tells Brazovics he finds his treatment of Timéa disgusting. He tells him that he had better fear the day when they'll meet again. He says goodbye to Timéa, promising her he will return, and then leaves.

The whole town follows Timár's actions in the financial world and when he starts buying land near Komárom, Brazovics thinks Timár knows something he doesn't. He guesses that it must be that the State plans fortifications to be extended around the town; therefore, the lands will be expropriated and the owners will get a large compensation, much more than the lands were originally worth. The only question is where will this work begin, since construction will last for at least thirty years, and in order to gain much, one has to buy the lands where the constructions will be started first. With false information, Timár tricks Brazovics into investing all his money into lands where the construction will not start in the following decades.

The day of Athalie's wedding has come. When Timéa wakes up, she sees Athalie in the bridal dress she made for herself, and realizes that it will be Athalie's wedding, not hers.

The news comes that Brazovics is ruined, and that the lands he invested in are worthless. He dies. Kacsuka breaks his engagement with Athalie, for he only wanted her for her money. Brazovics's creditors are demanding their money, and all of his property is auctioned off. Timár buys everything and gives it to Timéa, then asks her to marry him. Timéa, although she loves Kacsuka, agrees to marry him, out of gratitude. She asks Timár to allow Athalie and her mother to stay with them. Timár agrees and offers to give a rich dowry to Athalie so that she can marry the Kacsuka, but Athalie says she doesn't want Kacsuka any more. She says she will stay with them as Timéa's servant girl.

Part III – The "No Man's Island"
After the wedding, Timár realizes that though Timéa respects him enormously, she is not in love with him. He provides Timéa with gifts, jewels, and travels to foreign countries, in the hope of making her falling in love with him, but without any success. They move into the luxurious Brazovics mansion in Komárom. Athalie is intent on making them miserable.

Timár begins to suspect that Timéa loves someone else. He decides to test her. He tells her he will travel to Levetinc and spend a month there. He leaves, but returns the same night to see if Timéa is with someone else. He finds the sleeping Timéa alone in her bedroom. He runs into Athalie who knows what's on his mind. Athalie, who is watching Timéa's every move, tells Timár that Timéa does not love him, and confirms Timár's suspicions about who Timéa loves; but she also tells him that Timéa is faithful to him and will always remain faithful. Timár feels he cannot stay, and leaves his home as if pursued.

In his travels he finds himself near the No Man's Island, and decides to visit its dwellers. He feels at home with Teréza and Noémi, who is now sixteen years old. Noémi carefully asks him if he has anybody waiting for him to return home, and Timár lies and tells her that no one is waiting for him.

Part IV – Noémi 

In the winter, Timar arranges for the affairs of the farm, and as spring arrives, he rushes down to the island of Nobody to Noémi.  When he arrives, he sadly sees that last year’s flood killed the beautiful big walnut trees.  When he reaches the hut, he finds a small child with the two women.  Teresa says the son of a smuggler who died here ... Timar immediately falls in love with the child and decides to cut down the walnut trees and build a house for them.  However, as autumn approaches, Mihály leaves the island again.

At home, on the advice of doctors, he sends Timea to Meran with Athalie.  He himself receives a sculptor and builds a revelry with him on his monastery estate.  He will help him on his own, he will still need experience ... Spring will find him again on the island, where he dispels the suspicions of fishermen by calling his carpentry tools a weapon, and so the locals consider him a freedom hero.

On the island, Timar continues to build the house, but suddenly the "onion glaze" (typhus) falls off his feet, and he only lies for weeks while Noémi nurtures him unbroken.  When Mihály's condition starts to improve, it turns out that little Dódi has diphteria.  The disease is incurable, his body is buried on the island, a rose bush is planted above it, but Mihály dares to tell this only after he has fully recovered.

After what happened, Timar goes home again, where they immediately see that he is ill, that he is in danger of death.  The doctors advise him to travel somewhere, so he goes to his castle in the Balaton Uplands.  Here, after a long, lonely contemplation, he realizes that he can no longer live such a double life.  First, decide to end your life.  To this end, he also travels to the island of Nobody in the spring.

However, when he arrives on the island, he gets a new purpose in life, and he finds a little boy in the hut again.  According to Teréza, he is also the son of a dead smuggler ... Timár continues to build a house, which he successfully completes in four years.  Then Teréza tells him bad news: his heart is sick, he will die again this year.  Hearing this, Archbishop Sándorovics arrives on the island to confess Teresa, but the woman is already a little distant from her religion.  It doesn't matter that the priest doesn't break into the other room because he wants to know who Noémi's future will be.  Only the presence of the woman's soul saves the situation.  Teresa will soon leave the living.  She is buried in an unmarked grave on the island of Nobody without a coffin.

Part V – Athalie
When Timar returns home, Athalie tells him that Timea is unfaithful.  He recommends that Timar pretend to leave and then shows him a secret corridor from which he can listen to the conversation between Timéa and Kacsuka, who has since been promoted to major.  However, the dialogue reveals something completely different: Mr. Kacsuka defended Timar’s honor against a tramp in a duel, and Timea assures him that he is loyal to his grave.  Timar leaves the house sensitively and upset.

Timár hides in his house on Rác Street, where he starts reading his accumulated mail.  A letter reveals that his protégé, Krisztyán Tódor, cheated on him and stole him in Brazil for being sentenced to fifteen years in galley, but he also escaped from there.  Reading this, Timar no longer has to stay in this city ...

Not to be noticed, he walks across the frozen Danube.  However, the fog descends and Timár finds the other side only after almost nine hours of walking.  Here he receives a car and transports him to his castle at Lake Balaton.  Local fishermen gather on Lake Balaton, under the guidance of Master Galambos, they cut down the lake and have a rich catch through it.  Timar celebrates with them and then writes his last letter to Timea, who also sends a small fish.

That night, Timar is resting in his castle when an unexpected guest arrives in Krisztia.  Not as good a soul as they were when they last met.  Mihály nails a rifle and tells him of Brazil's ordeals: He stole ten million thieves, but was captured and sentenced to galley arrest.  However, he is known in his captivity to his father, who told him who his principal was and that he had once followed him because of the fugitive bastard.  To his greatest shock, his father knew Ali Csorbadzsi, for he had once warned the Khazarnia that they were about to take his life.  But the bastard played him and didn't pay him, even though he promised his daughter Tódor!  From this, the boy "realized" that Timar had killed the bastard and kidnapped his treasures.  His father died in bondage, and he fled with his two companions.  And now he threatens Timar that if he does not hand over to him the island of Nobody with Noemi as a temporary hiding place, he will win over the Austrian and Turkish governments, and even Timea and Noemi.  Mihály jumps on this, pushes him out the door.  But he won't kill him, he's put up with his fate ...

Timár decides for the second time that he will commit suicide, so he goes to the roar on Lake Balaton to strangle himself.  However, when it gets there, the water raises the head of a corpse to the surface.  It is Krisztyán Tódor.

Timar visits the island of Nobody, Noemi.  Upon his arrival, the grateful Almira, whom on his previous visit still greets Christ, was wounded to death with his pistol, with his last strength, and then perished.  Michael promises to never leave Noemi again.

In the spring, fishermen found a corpse among the melting ice in Lake Balaton.  Everyone in the body wants to explore Timar.  And Krisztyán (as he was) is buried in the Levetinczy's own graveyard with the greatest honor, like the Hungarian Order of St. Stephen, the Italian Order of St. Moritz and the Brazilian Order of Annunziata.

Ms. Zofia visits Mr. Kacsuka, who tells her it’s time to break the long mourning, try to win the heart of Timéa, who is still in love.  With that, he wants to finally be able to marry Athalie too, because she can't take the house anymore.

Timar teaches Dodi everything, including writing.  He suddenly realizes how much Timéa is at risk for revenge-hungry Athalie.  Therefore, since no one else can write a letter home, they ask Dodi to write to Timea the secret corridor that opens into the woman's room.

The old scene is repeated, only the roles change.  Timéa decides to invite Duck to her "ball" of the name day, where she extends her hand to her.  In less than half a year, they are getting ready for the wedding at the house.  Athalie is now dressing Timea in her wedding dress.

The last night before the wedding, Athalie mixes dream powder into the maid’s drink, which is not consumed only by Ms. Sophia, so everyone except her sleeps.  He is lurking in the secret corridor, and after Timéa goes to bed after the major leaves, he attacks him with his own sword (i.e., Timéa received it from Kacsuka, with which he fought against Christian), but his cuts are not fatal.  Ms. Zofia wakes up to the noise and shouts for the patrol.  Athalie runs away, Timéa faints.  Athalie is later found in her room, mimicking sleep.

Athalie is sued, but there is no evidence, she denies everything and Timéa refuses to accuse her.  Timea asks her expectant husband to read the letters she received.  When the Major reads Dodi's letter, he realizes everything, revealing the hideout, with the signs of sin in it: the sword and the bloody clothes.  Once Timea recovers, the wedding takes place.  However, Timea has yet to go through the confrontation at trial.  Athalie is convicted, but she leaves one last sting in Timea's heart: she says only she and Timar knew about the hideout, so Timea's previous husband has yet to live.

Forty years have passed, but Athalie has never sought pardon during that time.  He claims that if he is released, he will kill Timea immediately.  And poor woman has long since died.  He was buried in Levetinc, so that the cause of his father's death, Tisztor Krisztyán, did not end up.

Forty years have passed.  The writer visits the island of Nobody with his friend, where a peaceful little colony lives.  Descendants of two people, about forty.  A man in his forties, Deoda, greets them, who leads their visitors to a wooden house where the "old men" live.  The old man greets them and asks the author to write his story: for he has "left the world in which they were staring and made himself a world where they are loved."  The islanders still have approx.  they can live in peace on the island of Nobody for fifty years.

Translations
Agnes Hegan Kennard's English translation, with the title Timar's Two Worlds, was published in 1888. A revised edition appeared in 1975 with Corvina Press and was titled The Man with the Golden Touch.

Film, TV or theatrical adaptations
The novel was made into motion pictures in 1918, 1936, 1962 and 2005 (the latest was made for TV). The 1918 version was directed by Alexander Korda. The film versions are all titled Az aranyember, in accordance with modern spelling.

Notes

References

External links
 Timar’s Two Worlds, English translation by Mrs. Hegan Kennard (Gutenberg.org)
 Summary of the plot (Hunlit, Hungarian Literature)

1872 novels
Hungarian novels
Hungarian novels adapted into films